Nubhetepti (nb-ḥtp.tỉ, "Gold [=Hathor] is satisfied") was an ancient Egyptian queen with the titles king's wife and king's mother. She is mainly known from scarab seals, which are datable by style to the 13th Dynasty, around 1750 BC. She is also known from a statuette found at Semna. Her husband is unknown. However, king Hor had a daughter called Nubhetepti-khered. This translates as Nubhetepti-the-child and indicates that there was another (older) Nubhetepti around at the same time. For that reason it has been argued that Nubhetepti was the wife of king Hor and perhaps the mother of the princess 
Nubhetepti-khered. There are other scarabs of a queen Nubhetepti with the titles Great Royal Wife and she united with the white crown. These scarabs belong perhaps to another queen with the same name.

References
 K.S.B. Ryholt, The Political Situation in Egypt during the Second Intermediate Period (Carsten Niebuhr Institute Publications, vol. 20. Copenhagen: Museum Tusculanum Press, 1997), 38-39

References 

18th-century BC women
Queens consort of the Thirteenth Dynasty of Egypt
Great Royal Wives